CFVZ-FM is a Canadian radio station that broadcasts a sports format at 90.9 FM in Moose Jaw, Saskatchewan.

CFVZ is owned and operated by Moose Jaw Tier 1 Hockey. The station broadcasts the Moose Jaw Warriors hockey games.

References

External links
Moose Jaw Warriors Hockey | Western Hockey League

Radio stations in Moose Jaw
Sports radio stations in Canada
Year of establishment missing